The men's pole vault event at the 1974 British Commonwealth Games was held on 31 January at the Queen Elizabeth II Park in Christchurch, New Zealand.

Results

References

Athletics at the 1974 British Commonwealth Games
1974